Circumferential Road 5 (C-5), informally known as the C-5 Road, is a network of roads and bridges that all together form the fifth beltway of Metro Manila in the Philippines.

It runs parallel to the four other beltways around Metro Manila, and is also known for being the second most important transportation corridor after Circumferential Road 4.

The route is not yet complete to date, because of certain controversies regarding right of way, but portions of the route are already open for public use. On July 23, 2019, the two segments of the route has been connected together with the completion of the C-5 Southlink Expressway, through a  flyover over the Skyway and the SLEX in 2019.

Route description
C-5 lies parallel to other circumferential roads around Metro Manila, most notably EDSA of C-4, passing through the cities of Valenzuela, Quezon City, Pasig, Makati, Taguig, Pasay, Parañaque, and Las Piñas. The road is divided into several segments.

NLEX Harbor Link Project

From MacArthur Highway in Karuhatan, Valenzuela to Smart Connect Interchange, a cloverleaf interchange with the main line of the North Luzon Expressway (NLEX), C-5 is known as NLEX Karuhatan Link or NLEX Segment 9. It is also the first segment of the NLEX Harbor Link project, which connects the NLEX with Port of Manila. The entire  toll road is designated as a part of C-5 Road.

From the Smart Connect Interchange to a 3-way signalized junction with Mindanao Avenue, C-5 is known as NLEX–Mindanao Avenue Link or NLEX Segment 8.1. The entire  toll road is also designated as a part of C-5 Road.

Mindanao Avenue

At the eastern end of NLEX Segment 8.1, C-5 turns southeast and becomes Mindanao Avenue. It is a 10-lane divided carriageway that serves as the main transportation corridor of Barangays Talipapa and Tandang Sora in Quezon City. The  portion of this  road from NLEX Segment 8.1 to Congressional Avenue is designated as a portion of C-5.

Congressional Avenue

At the signaled junction with Mindanao Avenue, C-5 turns northeast as the Congressional Avenue, a six-lane divided carriageway that serves as the main east to west transportation corridor of Barangays Bahay Toro, Culiat, Pasong Tamo, and Tandang Sora in Quezon City. It then continues east for  up to Luzon Avenue.

Luzon Avenue

At the end of Congressional Avenue Extension, C-5 turns south as Luzon Avenue, a 4-lane divided city road between Barangays Culiat and Matandang Balara in Quezon City, for  up to Commonwealth Avenue. The 6-lane Luzon Avenue Flyover carries C-5 across Commonwealth Avenue to connect it with Tandang Sora Avenue.

Tandang Sora Avenue

Southeast of Commonwealth Avenue, C-5 is known as Tandang Sora Avenue.

The original planned route of C-5 included the entire  road; however, due to the incapacity of the road to carry a large amount of vehicular traffic, only the  portion of the road from the Luzon Avenue Flyover to Magsaysay Avenue was designated as a portion of C-5 Road.

Katipunan Avenue

After crossing Magsaysay Avenue, C-5 turns south and becomes Katipunan Avenue, a ten-lane divided carriageway that serves as the main transportation corridor of Matandang Balara, Pansol, Loyola Heights, and Project 4 in Quezon City. It heads south for  until its junction with Bonny Serrano Avenue. Shortly before crossing Bonny Serrano Avenue, a 4-lane divided underpass descends from Katipunan Avenue and traverses underneath Col. Bonny Serrano Avenuel and ascends into Libis Flyover, which immediately connects it to E. Rodriguez Jr. Avenue.

Colonel Bonny Serrano Avenue

C-5 passes through a section of Colonel Bonny Serrano Avenue, a four-lane undivided avenue, as a connecting corridor  from Katipunan Avenue to Eulogio Rodriguez Jr. Avenue. The Libis Tunnel and Libis Flyover traverse between the avenue's westbound and eastbound lanes.

Eulogio Rodriguez Jr. Avenue

The road ends in a junction with Pasig Boulevard and continues onto C.P. Garcia Bridge that crosses the Pasig River and eventually becomes Carlos P. Garcia Avenue shortly afterwards. The avenue is named after Eulogio Rodriguez Jr., a former representative and governor of Rizal.

Carlos P. Garcia Avenue

Past the C.P. Garcia Bridge over the Pasig River, C-5 becomes Carlos P. Garcia Avenue. It passes through a small portion of Embo, Makati and continuously passing Taguig, where it bypasses Bonifacio Global City and meets the exit ramps to the C-5 Southlink Expressway and the South Luzon Expressway, before ending at the intersection with East Service Road.

This is not to be mistaken with the legal name of the C-5 route.

C-5 Road Extension
Across the South Luzon Expressway, C-5 continues as C-5 Road Extension from West Service Road near Merville Exit of SLEX in Pasay. It also serves as the two frontage roads of C-5 Southlink Expressway's section in Pasay. It traverses south of Ninoy Aquino International Airport and enters Parañaque. In Barangay Santo Niño, C-5 is briefly known as Kaingin Road, passing by warehouses up to Multinational Avenue. It then curves around Amvel City, crosses Dr. A. Santos Avenue and Diego Cera Avenue, and ends at its future exit with Manila–Cavite Expressway (CAVITEX) in Las Piñas. The future LRT Line 1 Extension will run along most of the Las Piñas segment of C-5 Road Extension.

Location on the West Valley Fault
Studies conducted by the PHIVOLCS revealed that a large portion of C-5 is built on top of the West Valley Fault. A map of the fault line released on May 18, 2015, shows C-5 in Taguig beside the fault line. The C-5 road is prone to liquefaction.

History

The proposal for the Metro Manila Arterial Road System was done in the late 1960s. The proposal states of building 10 radial roads and 6 circumferential roads to support the growing vehicular population of Metro Manila.

The Circumferential Road 5 began construction in 1996. The first phase of the C-5 Road, which costed approximately ₱1.2 billion to construct, was officially inaugurated by President Ramos on December 30, 1994. Under the power of Republic Act 8224, which was passed on November 6, 1996, the C-5 road was legally known as President Carlos P. Garcia Avenue, honoring the eighth president of the Republic of the Philippines, Carlos P. Garcia.

Extensions
On July 23, 2007, President Gloria Macapagal Arroyo announced on her State of the Nation Address that C-5 Road will be extended to the north of Metro Manila, from North Luzon Expressway in Quezon City to Navotas and will be extended in the south from South Luzon Expressway in Taguig–Parañaque boundary to Coastal Road in Las Piñas in the southern part of Ninoy Aquino International Airport.

As of June 2010, the NLEX–Mindanao Avenue Link (Segment 8.1) in Valenzuela and Congressional Avenue Extension from Tandang Sora to Luzon Avenues in Quezon City have been opened to all motorists in the North Extension. Carlos P. Garcia Avenue Extension in the South Extension located in Parañaque were also opened.

In March 2015, the NLEX–Karuhatan Link (Segment 9) was opened to all motorists. The opening of the Segment 9 from NLEx to MacArthur Highway in Karuhatan, Valenzuela served as a preparation for the Holy Week season.

At present, the new Luzon Avenue Flyover connecting Tandang Sora and Luzon Avenues across Commonwealth Avenue was opened to all motorists. Prior to the opening of the flyover, the Congressional Avenue Extension from Visayas to Luzon Avenue was opened in 2010 to decongest heavy traffic in Visayas–Tandang Sora Avenue Intersection.

Controversies
In 2012, the Senate of the Philippines investigated the south extension project where it would pass several of Manny Villar's properties, such as Camella. The original extension, called Manila–Cavite Toll Expressway Project (MCTEP), was already approved by the Senate and would have been made as a toll expressway. The project eventually resurrected as C-5 Southlink Expressway.

C-5 Expressway
NLEX Corporation (formerly Manila North Tollways Corporation) and CAVITEX Infrastructure Inc., submitted a proposal for C-5 Expressway, a  fully elevated expressway that would further decongest the existing C-5 and provide a fully controlled-access route between C-5 Southlink Expressway and NLEX Segment 8.2. The proposed expressway would utilize portions of the existing C-5's right of way between SLEX and Pasig Boulevard, and run above Marikina River from Pasig Boulevard to Luzon Avenue.

Exits and intersections

NLEX Mindanao Avenue & Karuhatan Link

C-5 Extension

Notes

References

Routes in Metro Manila